Senegal competed at the 2012 Summer Olympics in London, from 27 July to 12 August 2012. This was the nation's thirteenth appearance at the Olympics.

The Senegalese National Olympic and Sports Committee sent the nation's second-largest delegation ever to the Games, tying with the delegation sent to Moscow in 1980. A total of 32 athletes, 25 men and 7 women, competed in 8 sports. Men's football was the only team-based sport in which Senegal was represented at these Olympic Games. There was only a single competitor in sprint canoeing, fencing, judo, and taekwondo.

Four Senegalese athletes had competed in Beijing, including Ndiss Kaba Badji, who finished sixth in men's long jump. Breaststroke swimmer Malick Fall became the first Senegalese athlete to compete in four Olympic Games. Meanwhile, track sprinter Amy Mbacké Thiam made her Olympic comeback in London after an eight-year absence. Judoka and double African champion Hortense Diédhiou was the nation's flag bearer at the opening ceremony.

Senegal, however, failed to win its first Olympic medal since the 1988 Summer Olympics in Seoul, where Amadou Dia Bâ won silver in the 400m hurdles.

Athletics

Senegalese athletes have so far achieved qualifying standards in the following athletics events (up to a maximum of 3 athletes in each event at the 'A' Standard, and 1 at the 'B' Standard):

Key
 Note – Ranks given for track events are within the athlete's heat only
 Q = Qualified for the next round
 q = Qualified for the next round as a fastest loser or, in field events, by position without achieving the qualifying target
 NR = National record
 N/A = Round not applicable for the event
 Bye = Athlete not required to compete in round

Men
Track & road events

Field events

Women
Track & road events

Field events

Canoeing

Sprint

Qualification Legend: FA = Qualify to final (medal); FB = Qualify to final B (non-medal)

Fencing

Senegal has qualified 1 fencer.

Men

Football

Senegal has qualified a men's team.
 Men's team event – 1 team of 18 players

Men's tournament

Team roster

Group play

Quarter-final

Judo

Swimming

Senegalese swimmers have so far achieved qualifying standards in one event (up to a maximum of 2 swimmers in each event at the Olympic Qualifying Time (OQT), and potentially 1 at the Olympic Selection Time (OST)): Senegal also gained a "Universality place" from the FINA.

Men

Women

Taekwondo

Senegal has qualified 1 athlete.

Wrestling

Senegal has qualified two quota places.

Key:
  – Victory by Fall.
  – Decision by Points – the loser with technical points.
  – Decision by Points – the loser without technical points.

Men's freestyle

Women's freestyle

References

Nations at the 2012 Summer Olympics
2012
Summer Olympics